Tegur is a village in Dharwad district of Karnataka, India.

References

Villages in Belagavi district